Latvian Football Cup 2008 was the sixty-seventh season of the Latvian annual football knock-out competition. For the first time it was won by FK Daugava Daugavpils, by outrivaling FK Ventspils. The winners qualified for the second qualifying round of the UEFA Europa League 2009–10.

First round

Second round

Third round

Quarterfinals

Semifinals

Final

External links
Latvian Cup on rsssf.com
LFF.lv

2008
Cup
Latvian Football Cup